Qaminis or Ghemines is a small town adjacent to the Gulf of Sidra in the Cyrenaica region of northwestern Libya.

Qaminis was known Chaminos, before being conquered by Muslim forces in 642 CE.

Qaminis is slowly growing as new houses are being built, mostly by new citizens moving to the town. The former Libyan government did not have a large impact upon the town.

See also
 List of cities in Libya

Notes

Populated coastal places in Libya
Populated places in Benghazi District
Cyrenaica
Baladiyat of Libya